Perry Township is one of the ten townships of Fayette County, Ohio, United States. As of the 2010 census the population was 1,041, up from 945 at the 2000 census.

Geography
Located in the southern part of the county, it borders the following townships:
Union Township - north
Wayne Township - northeast
Buckskin Township, Ross County - southeast corner
Madison Township, Highland County - south
Green Township - west
Concord Township - northwest

No municipalities are located in Perry Township.

Name and history
It is one of twenty-six Perry Townships statewide.

Government
The township is governed by a three-member board of trustees, who are elected in November of odd-numbered years to a four-year term beginning on the following January 1. Two are elected in the year after the presidential election and one is elected in the year before it. There is also an elected township fiscal officer, who serves a four-year term beginning on April 1 of the year after the election, which is held in November of the year before the presidential election. Vacancies in the fiscal officership or on the board of trustees are filled by the remaining trustees.

References

External links
County website

Townships in Fayette County, Ohio
Townships in Ohio